Everyday Is Christmas is the eighth studio album and first Christmas album by Australian singer-songwriter Sia, released on 17 November 2017 by Atlantic Records and Monkey Puzzle. Her first album with Atlantic, it features original Christmas songs. Initially released with ten tracks in 2017, the album has since been reissued in 2018, 2021, and 2022 with new bonus tracks each time. The lead single, "Santa's Coming for Us", was released on 30 October 2017, and "Snowman" was released as the second on 9 November.

Recording and release
Sia confirmed the release of her first Christmas album on 1 August 2017, alongside the announcement that she had left RCA Records and signed for Atlantic Records. The album became her first release through Atlantic and features original songs co-written with longtime collaborator Greg Kurstin, who worked heavily on Sia's previous three studio albums: We Are Born (2010), 1000 Forms of Fear (2014) and This Is Acting (2016). Sia's frequent dance collaborator, Maddie Ziegler, is featured on the album cover. The standard version of the album consists of ten songs, all produced by Kurstin.  

Recording sessions for the album took place over two weeks in May 2017 and left Sia and Kurstin "laughing at the end of each day". In September, Kurstin said of working on the album with Sia: The album was released on 17 November 2017. In Japan, an exclusive domestic bonus track titled "My Old Santa Claus" was included on the CD. The song was later included on the deluxe edition of the album, released in November 2018, alongside "Sing for My Life" and a cover of Perry Como's "Round and Round". In the United States, the deluxe edition CD was released as a Target exclusive. 

On 5 November 2021, another deluxe edition was released. Subtitled the Snowman Deluxe Edition, it included three bonus tracks, in addition to those on the 2018 deluxe edition: "Pin Drop", "Santa Visits Everyone", and the "Slowed Down & Snowed In TikTok Remix" of "Snowman". On 11 November 2022, the Snowman Deluxe Edition was reissued with four additional tracks: "Naughty & Nice", "12 Nights", "3 Minutes 'Til New Years", and a sped-up version of "Snowman". "2 Minutes 'Til New Years" was included on yet another digital reissue of the album on 30 December 2022.

Promotion
The lead single, "Santa's Coming for Us", was released on 30 October 2017, along with the pre-order of the album. A music video of the song was released on 22 November, which stars Kristen Bell hosting a Christmas party. The song reached a peak position of number 9 on Billboard Holiday Digital Song Sales chart, number 1 on the Adult Contemporary chart, and 51 on the Holiday Top 100. It peaked at 39 in the United Kingdom and debuted at 70 in Scotland.

"Snowman", released on 9 November 2017, reached a peak position of 3 in the Holiday Digital Song Sales chart. Additional songs also charted on the Holiday Digital Song Sales chart, with "Candy Cane Lane" peaking at 13 and "Everyday Is Christmas" peaking at 28. Sia appeared on Ellen (with Maddie Ziegler) and on The Voice to perform "Snowman".

The music video for "Snowman", directed by Lior Molcho, premiered on 30 October 2020.

Critical reception

At Metacritic, which assigns a normalised rating out of 100 to reviews from mainstream critics, the album received an average score of 59 based on 6 reviews, indicating "mixed or average reviews".

Katherine St. Asaph of Pitchfork wrote that Everyday Is Christmas, as an album, feels "inconsistent and underwritten", comparing it to "opening a gift where someone’s forgotten to remove the tags". Asaph described the production as "vaguely festive" and criticised the positioning of "Snowman" next to "Snowflake" in the track listing, considering they both make use of the same metaphor. Allan Raible of ABC News, however, praised the record, noting Sia designed the album for those "who are turned off" by the holiday classics. Annabel Ross of Rolling Stone Australia wrote that, although Sia would have done a "fine job" interpreting the classics, with she and Kurstin crafting new, original songs, it was "hard to veer too far wrong" with them.

Commercial performance
The album debuted at number 27 on the Billboard 200, selling 19,000 album-equivalent units, while 15,000 of those were pure album sales.

Track listing

Personnel
Credits adapted from the liner notes of Everyday Is Christmas.

 Sia – songwriting, vocals, concept, art direction
 Greg Kurstin – songwriting, production, bass, drums , keyboards , piano , guitar , percussion , organ , vibraphone , pump organ , Mellotron , celeste , whistling , baritone guitar , glockenspiel , engineering
 David Ralicke – trumpet, trombone, baritone sax, bass sax , tenor sax , Mellophone, Euphonium, soprano sax 
 Alex Pasco – engineering
 Julian Burg – engineering
 Serban Ghenea – mixing
 John Hanes – mix engineering
 RJ Shaughnessy – photography
 Tonya Brewer – glam
 Samantha Burkhart – wardrobe
 Leigh Poindexter – art direction
 Virgilio Tzaj – design

Charts

Weekly charts

Year-end charts

Certifications and sales

References

2017 Christmas albums
Albums produced by Greg Kurstin
Atlantic Records albums
Christmas albums by Australian artists
Pop Christmas albums
Sia (musician) albums